The women's 100 metre breaststroke competition of the swimming events at the 2012 European Aquatics Championships took place May 22 and 23. The heats and semifinals took place on May 22, the final on May 23.

Records
Prior to the competition, the existing world, European and championship records were as follows.

Results

Heats
49 swimmers participated in 7 heats.

Semifinals
The eight fasters swimmers advanced to the final.

Semifinal 1

Semifinal 2

Final
The final was held at 17.52.

References

Women's 100 m breaststroke